The 2002–03 Columbus Blue Jackets season was the Blue Jackets' third season in the National Hockey League (NHL), as the team was coming off of a 22–47–8–5 record in the 2001–02 season, earning 57 points and finishing in last in the Western Conference.

Offseason
Ray Whitney was named team captain on October 9.

Regular season
The Blue Jackets got off to a good start, having a 7–5–1–1 record in their opening 14 games. Columbus, however, won only two of their next 12 games to fall out of the playoff picture. The club would play mediocre hockey for the rest of the season, finishing with a 29–42–8–3 record, earning 69 points for last place in the Western Conference for the second-straight season. Midway through the season, Columbus fired head coach Dave King after a 14–20–4–2 start. King was replaced by general manager Doug MacLean on an interim basis, as the Blue Jackets posted a record of 15–22–4–1 record under his guidance. The 69 points was a 12-point improvement over the previous season, but the club finished 23 points behind the Edmonton Oilers for the final playoff spot in the Conference. The previous season, the Blue Jackets scored a League-low 164 goals, however, the team would beat that total by 49 goals, finishing with a club record 213 goals. Columbus though led the NHL in goals against, allowing 263, also a club record.

Ray Whitney led the club in points for the second-straight season, earning a club record 76 points, as he scored 24 goals and 52 assists. Geoff Sanderson rebounded from an injury-plagued 2001–02 season to score a club record 34 goals, while Andrew Cassels earned 68 points in his first season in Columbus. David Vyborny had a breakout season, scoring 20 goals and 46 points. On the blueline, Jaroslav Spacek scored nine goals and earned 45 points in his first full season with the team. Jody Shelley led the team with 249 penalty minutes, setting a franchise record.

In goal, Marc Denis got the bulk of the action, winning a club-record 27 games, while posting a 3.09 goals against average (GAA) and earning five shutouts along the way.

Season standings

Schedule and results

|- align="center" bgcolor="#bbffbb"
| 1 || October 10 || Chicago Blackhawks || 1–2 || Columbus Blue Jackets || 1–0–0–0 || 2 || 
|- align="center" bgcolor="#ffbbbb"
| 2 || October 12 || Columbus Blue Jackets || 2–3 || New Jersey Devils || 1–1–0–0 || 2 || 
|- align="center" bgcolor="#ffbbbb"
| 3 || October 14 || Phoenix Coyotes || 4–2 || Columbus Blue Jackets || 1–2–0–0 || 2 || 
|- align="center" bgcolor="#ffbbbb"
| 4 || October 17 || Columbus Blue Jackets || 1–7 || St. Louis Blues || 1–3–0–0 || 2 || 
|- align="center" bgcolor="#bbffbb"
| 5 || October 19 || Florida Panthers || 1–4 || Columbus Blue Jackets || 2–3–0–0 || 4 || 
|- align="center" 
| 6 || October 23 || Tampa Bay Lightning || 2–2 || Columbus Blue Jackets || 2–3–1–0 || 5 || 
|- align="center" bgcolor="#ffbbbb"
| 7 || October 25 || San Jose Sharks || 5–4 || Columbus Blue Jackets || 2–4–1–0 || 5 || 
|- align="center" bgcolor="#bbffbb"
| 8 || October 27 || Los Angeles Kings || 1–5 || Columbus Blue Jackets || 3–4–1–0 || 7 || 
|- align="center" bgcolor="#ffbbbb"
| 9 || October 29 || Columbus Blue Jackets || 2–3 || Chicago Blackhawks || 3–5–1–0 || 7 || 
|-

|- align="center" bgcolor="#bbffbb"
|10 || November 1 || Dallas Stars || 2–4 || Columbus Blue Jackets || 4–5–1–0 || 9 || 
|- align="center" bgcolor="#bbffbb"
|11 || November 3 || Buffalo Sabres || 2–3 || Columbus Blue Jackets || 5–5–1–0 || 11 || 
|- align="center" bgcolor="#ffffbb"
|12 || November 5 || Washington Capitals || 4–3 || Columbus Blue Jackets || 5–5–1–1 || 12 || 
|- align="center" bgcolor="#bbffbb"
|13 || November 7 || Columbus Blue Jackets || 5–2 || St. Louis Blues || 6–5–1–1 || 14 || 
|- align="center" bgcolor="#bbffbb"
|14 || November 9 || New York Rangers || 3–6 || Columbus Blue Jackets || 7–5–1–1 || 16 || 
|- align="center" bgcolor="#ffbbbb"
|15 || November 12 || Columbus Blue Jackets || 4–5 || Colorado Avalanche || 7–6–1–1 || 16 || 
|- align="center" bgcolor="#ffbbbb"
|16 || November 14 || Mighty Ducks of Anaheim || 3–2 || Columbus Blue Jackets || 7–7–1–1 || 16 || 
|- align="center" 
|17 || November 16 || Columbus Blue Jackets || 1–1 || Nashville Predators || 7–7–2–1 || 17 || 
|- align="center" bgcolor="#ffffbb"
|18 || November 17 || Columbus Blue Jackets || 2–3 || Dallas Stars || 7–7–2–2 || 18 || 
|- align="center" bgcolor="#bbffbb"
|19 || November 20 || St. Louis Blues || 2–3 || Columbus Blue Jackets || 8–7–2–2 || 20 || 
|- align="center" bgcolor="#ffbbbb"
|20 || November 22 || Columbus Blue Jackets || 4–5 || Buffalo Sabres || 8–8–2–2 || 20 || 
|- align="center" bgcolor="#ffbbbb"
|21 || November 23 || Columbus Blue Jackets || 2–5 || Ottawa Senators || 8–9–2–2 || 20 || 
|- align="center" bgcolor="#ffbbbb"
|22 || November 27 || Edmonton Oilers || 3–1 || Columbus Blue Jackets || 8–10–2–2 || 20 || 
|- align="center" bgcolor="#bbffbb"
|23 || November 29 || Columbus Blue Jackets || 4–2 || New York Islanders || 9–10–2–2 || 22 || 
|- align="center" bgcolor="#ffbbbb"
|24 || November 30 || Carolina Hurricanes || 4–2 || Columbus Blue Jackets || 9–11–2–2 || 22 || 
|-

|- align="center" bgcolor="#ffbbbb"
|25 || December 3 || Columbus Blue Jackets || 3–5 || New York Rangers || 9–12–2–2 || 22 || 
|- align="center" bgcolor="#ffbbbb"
|26 || December 6 || Columbus Blue Jackets || 2–3 || San Jose Sharks || 9–13–2–2 || 22 || 
|- align="center" bgcolor="#bbffbb"
|27 || December 7 || Columbus Blue Jackets || 4–2 || Los Angeles Kings || 10–13–2–2 || 24 || 
|- align="center" 
|28 || December 9 || Columbus Blue Jackets || 2–2 || Phoenix Coyotes || 10–13–3–2 || 25 || 
|- align="center" bgcolor="#bbffbb"
|29 || December 12 || New Jersey Devils || 2–4 || Columbus Blue Jackets || 11–13–3–2 || 27 || 
|- align="center" bgcolor="#ffbbbb"
|30 || December 14 || Columbus Blue Jackets || 4–6 || Detroit Red Wings || 11–14–3–2 || 27 || 
|- align="center" bgcolor="#bbffbb"
|31 || December 19 || Calgary Flames || 0–3 || Columbus Blue Jackets || 12–14–3–2 || 29 || 
|- align="center" bgcolor="#ffbbbb"
|32 || December 20 || Columbus Blue Jackets || 1–3 || Chicago Blackhawks || 12–15–3–2 || 29 || 
|- align="center" bgcolor="#ffbbbb"
|33 || December 23 || Detroit Red Wings || 1–0 || Columbus Blue Jackets || 12–16–3–2 || 29 || 
|- align="center" bgcolor="#ffbbbb"
|34 || December 26 || Columbus Blue Jackets || 2–4 || Detroit Red Wings || 12–17–3–2 || 29 || 
|- align="center" bgcolor="#ffbbbb"
|35 || December 28 || St. Louis Blues || 6–1 || Columbus Blue Jackets || 12–18–3–2 || 29 || 
|- align="center" bgcolor="#ffbbbb"
|36 || December 29 || Columbus Blue Jackets || 2–5 || St. Louis Blues || 12–19–3–2 || 29 || 
|- align="center" bgcolor="#bbffbb"
|37 || December 31 || Pittsburgh Penguins || 2–5 || Columbus Blue Jackets || 13–19–3–2 || 31 || 
|-

|- align="center" 
|38 || January 3 || Columbus Blue Jackets || 2–2 || Washington Capitals || 13–19–4–2 || 32 || 
|- align="center" bgcolor="#bbffbb"
|39 || January 4 || Phoenix Coyotes || 0–2 || Columbus Blue Jackets || 14–19–4–2 || 34 || 
|- align="center" bgcolor="#ffbbbb"
|40 || January 6 || Nashville Predators || 5–1 || Columbus Blue Jackets || 14–20–4–2 || 34 || 
|- align="center" bgcolor="#bbffbb"
|41 || January 8 || Columbus Blue Jackets || 2–1 || Minnesota Wild || 15–20–4–2 || 36 || 
|- align="center" bgcolor="#bbffbb"
|42 || January 10 || Columbus Blue Jackets || 3–2 || Vancouver Canucks || 16–20–4–2 || 38 || 
|- align="center" bgcolor="#bbffbb"
|43 || January 11 || Columbus Blue Jackets || 7–2 || Calgary Flames || 17–20–4–2 || 40 || 
|- align="center" bgcolor="#ffbbbb"
|44 || January 13 || Columbus Blue Jackets || 5–8 || Edmonton Oilers || 17–21–4–2 || 40 || 
|- align="center" bgcolor="#ffbbbb"
|45 || January 15 || Mighty Ducks of Anaheim || 4–3 || Columbus Blue Jackets || 17–22–4–2 || 40 || 
|- align="center" bgcolor="#ffbbbb"
|46 || January 18 || Columbus Blue Jackets || 2–7 || Boston Bruins || 17–23–4–2 || 40 || 
|- align="center" bgcolor="#bbffbb"
|47 || January 20 || Chicago Blackhawks || 1–5 || Columbus Blue Jackets || 18–23–4–2 || 42 || 
|- align="center" bgcolor="#ffbbbb"
|48 || January 22 || Columbus Blue Jackets || 2–4 || Dallas Stars || 18–24–4–2 || 42 || 
|- align="center" bgcolor="#ffbbbb"
|49 || January 23 || Columbus Blue Jackets || 0–5 || Colorado Avalanche || 18–25–4–2 || 42 || 
|- align="center" bgcolor="#bbffbb"
|50 || January 25 || New York Islanders || 1–4 || Columbus Blue Jackets || 19–25–4–2 || 44 || 
|- align="center" 
|51 || January 28 || Colorado Avalanche || 2–2 || Columbus Blue Jackets || 19–25–5–2 || 45 || 
|- align="center" bgcolor="#bbffbb"
|52 || January 30 || Nashville Predators || 1–2 || Columbus Blue Jackets || 20–25–5–2 || 47 || 
|-

|- align="center" 
|53 || February 5 || Vancouver Canucks || 4–4 || Columbus Blue Jackets || 20–25–6–2 || 48 || 
|- align="center" bgcolor="#ffbbbb"
|54 || February 8 || Columbus Blue Jackets || 2–3 || Nashville Predators || 20–26–6–2 || 48 || 
|- align="center" bgcolor="#bbffbb"
|55 || February 12 || San Jose Sharks || 0–1 || Columbus Blue Jackets || 21–26–6–2 || 50 || 
|- align="center" bgcolor="#bbffbb"
|56 || February 13 || Columbus Blue Jackets || 2–1 || Montreal Canadiens || 22–26–6–2 || 52 || 
|- align="center" bgcolor="#ffbbbb"
|57 || February 15 || Chicago Blackhawks || 7–1 || Columbus Blue Jackets || 22–27–6–2 || 52 || 
|- align="center" bgcolor="#ffbbbb"
|58 || February 18 || Columbus Blue Jackets || 2–5 || Phoenix Coyotes || 22–28–6–2 || 52 || 
|- align="center" bgcolor="#ffbbbb"
|59 || February 19 || Columbus Blue Jackets || 0–2 || Mighty Ducks of Anaheim || 22–29–6–2 || 52 || 
|- align="center" bgcolor="#ffbbbb"
|60 || February 21 || Columbus Blue Jackets || 0–6 || San Jose Sharks || 22–30–6–2 || 52 || 
|- align="center" bgcolor="#ffbbbb"
|61 || February 23 || Columbus Blue Jackets || 2–7 || Vancouver Canucks || 22–31–6–2 || 52 || 
|- align="center" bgcolor="#ffbbbb"
|62 || February 25 || Columbus Blue Jackets || 0–5 || Nashville Predators || 22–32–6–2 || 52 || 
|- align="center" bgcolor="#bbffbb"
|63 || February 27 || Los Angeles Kings || 1–3 || Columbus Blue Jackets || 23–32–6–2 || 54 || 
|-

|- align="center" 
|64 || March 1 || Edmonton Oilers || 3–3 || Columbus Blue Jackets || 23–32–7–2 || 55 || 
|- align="center" bgcolor="#ffbbbb"
|65 || March 3 || Detroit Red Wings || 3–2 || Columbus Blue Jackets || 23–33–7–2 || 55 || 
|- align="center" bgcolor="#bbffbb"
|66 || March 6 || Vancouver Canucks || 4–5 || Columbus Blue Jackets || 24–33–7–2 || 57 || 
|- align="center" bgcolor="#ffffbb"
|67 || March 8 || Calgary Flames || 3–2 || Columbus Blue Jackets || 24–33–7–3 || 58 || 
|- align="center" bgcolor="#ffbbbb"
|68 || March 10 || Columbus Blue Jackets || 5–6 || Carolina Hurricanes || 24–34–7–3 || 58 || 
|- align="center" bgcolor="#ffbbbb"
|69 || March 11 || Dallas Stars || 2–0 || Columbus Blue Jackets || 24–35–7–3 || 58 || 
|- align="center" bgcolor="#ffbbbb" 
|70 || March 13 || Colorado Avalanche || 5–1 || Columbus Blue Jackets || 24–36–7–3 || 58 || 
|- align="center" bgcolor="#bbffbb"
|71 || March 15 || Minnesota Wild || 0–5 || Columbus Blue Jackets || 25–36–7–3 || 60 || 
|- align="center" bgcolor="#ffbbbb"
|72 || March 17 || Columbus Blue Jackets || 2–3 || Atlanta Thrashers || 25–37–7–3 || 60 || 
|- align="center" bgcolor="#bbffbb"
|73 || March 20 || Toronto Maple Leafs || 3–4 || Columbus Blue Jackets || 26–37–7–3 || 62 || 
|- align="center" bgcolor="#ffbbbb"
|74 || March 22 || Atlanta Thrashers || 3–2 || Columbus Blue Jackets || 26–38–7–3 || 62 || 
|- align="center" bgcolor="#ffbbbb"
|75 || March 24 || Columbus Blue Jackets || 0–5 || Mighty Ducks of Anaheim || 26–39–7–3 || 62 || 
|- align="center" bgcolor="#bbffbb"
|76 || March 25 || Columbus Blue Jackets || 2–1 || Los Angeles Kings || 27–39–7–3 || 64 || 
|- align="center" bgcolor="#ffbbbb"
|77 || March 28 || Columbus Blue Jackets || 0–4 || Edmonton Oilers || 27–40–7–3 || 64 || 
|- align="center" bgcolor="#bbffbb"
|78 || March 29 || Columbus Blue Jackets || 6–4 || Calgary Flames || 28–40–7–3 || 66 || 
|-

|- align="center" bgcolor="#ffbbbb"
|79 || April 1 || Columbus Blue Jackets || 0–4 || Philadelphia Flyers || 28–41–7–3 || 66 || 
|- align="center" bgcolor="#bbffbb"
|80 || April 2 || Minnesota Wild || 0–3 || Columbus Blue Jackets || 29–41–7–3 || 68 || 
|- align="center" 
|81 || April 4 || Detroit Red Wings || 5–5 || Columbus Blue Jackets || 29–41–8–3 || 69 || 
|- align="center" bgcolor="#ffbbbb"
|82 || April 6 || Columbus Blue Jackets || 3–4 || Minnesota Wild || 29–42–8–3 || 69 || 
|-

|-
| Legend:

Player statistics

Scoring
 Position abbreviations: C = Center; D = Defense; G = Goaltender; LW = Left Wing; RW = Right Wing
  = Joined team via a transaction (e.g., trade, waivers, signing) during the season. Stats reflect time with the Blue Jackets only.
  = Left team via a transaction (e.g., trade, waivers, release) during the season. Stats reflect time with the Blue Jackets only.

Goaltending

Awards and records

Awards

Records
Goaltender Marc Denis set the NHL record for most minutes played in a single season, surpassing Martin Brodeur’s mark set during the 1995–96 season. Brodeur would reclaim the record in 2003–04.

Transactions
The Blue Jackets were involved in the following transactions from June 14, 2002, the day after the deciding game of the 2002 Stanley Cup Finals, through June 9, 2003, the day of the deciding game of the 2003 Stanley Cup Finals.

Trades

Players acquired

Players lost

Signings

Draft picks
Columbus' draft picks at the 2002 NHL Entry Draft at the Air Canada Centre in Toronto, Ontario.

Notes

References

Columbus
Columbus Blue Jackets seasons
Col
Blue
Blue